The Cheltenham Prize is awarded at the English Cheltenham Literature Festival to the author of any book published in the relevant year which "has received less acclaim than it deserved".

Past winners
1979: Angela Carter for The Bloody Chamber
1980: Thomas Pakenham for The Boer War
1981: D. M. Thomas for The White Hotel
1982: Simon Gray for Quartermaine's Terms
1983: Alasdair Gray for Unlikely Stories, Mostly
1984: Beatrix Campbell for Wigan Pier Revisited
1985: Frank McLynn for The Jacobite Army of England: 1745, The Final Campaign
1986: Frank McGuiness for Observe the Sons of Ulster Marching Towards the Somme
1987: James Kelman for Greyhound for Breakfast
1988: Peter Robinson for The Other Life
1989: Medbh McGuckian for On Ballycastle Beach
1990: Hilary Mantel for Fludd
1991: Marius Kociejowski for Coast
1993: R. S. Thomas for Mass for Hard Times
1994: Lyndall Gordon for Charlotte Brontë: A Passionate Life
1995: Kazuo Ishiguro for The Unconsoled

References
Awards up to 1988: Prizewinning Literature: UK Literary Award Winners by Anne Strachan, publ. 1989 by Library Association Publishing Ltd 

English literary awards
Awards established in 1979
1979 establishments in England
British fiction awards